Sua, also known by other ethnic groups as Mansoanka or Kunante, is a divergent Niger–Congo language spoken in the Mansôa area of Guinea-Bissau.

References

Guillaume Segerer & Florian Lionnet 2010. "'Isolates' in 'Atlantic'". Language Isolates in Africa workshop, Lyon, Dec. 4

Mel languages
Languages of Guinea-Bissau